Kenny Green (born October 11, 1964) is an American former professional basketball player who was selected by the Washington Bullets in the first round (12th pick overall) of the 1985 NBA draft, one spot ahead of Hall of Famer Karl Malone. A 6'6" forward from Wake Forest University, Green played in two NBA seasons from 1985 to 1987. He played for the Bullets and Philadelphia 76ers. In his NBA career, he played in 60 games and scored a total of 265 points.

External links

1964 births
Living people
American expatriate basketball people in Turkey
American men's basketball players
Anadolu Efes S.K. players
Basketball players from Florida
Grand Rapids Hoops players
People from Eustis, Florida
Philadelphia 76ers players
Small forwards
Wake Forest Demon Deacons men's basketball players
Washington Bullets draft picks
Washington Bullets players